14 Comae Berenices is a single star in the northern constellation of Coma Berenices, and is the second brightest member of the Coma Star Cluster. It is a faint star but visible to the naked eye with an apparent visual magnitude of 4.95. Parallax measurements place the star at a distance of about 266 light years.

Abt & Morrell (1995) designated this a Lambda Boötis star but this was later refuted. No surface magnetic field has been detected on 14 Comae Bernices.

14 Comae Berenices is a well-known shell star with a high rate of spin, showing a projected rotational velocity of 226 km/s. This is giving the star an oblate shape with an equatorial bulge that is 12% larger than the polar radius. It is radiating 76 times the Sun's luminosity from its photosphere at an effective temperature of 7,300 K.

References

F-type stars
Shell stars
Ap stars
Coma Berenices
BD+28 2115
Comae Berenices, 14
108283
060697
4733